Karatali is a village under Chatrapur tahasil in Ganjam district in the Indian state of Odisha.

Demographics
With a total of 127 families residing, Karatali village has a population of 664, of which 344 are males and 320 are females as per Population Census 2011. Karatali village has a higher literacy rate compared to Odisha. In 2011, the literacy rate of Karatali village was 81.93 % compared to 72.87 % of Odisha. The village had a Male literacy rate of 97.30 % while the female literacy rate was 65.96%. The average sex ratio of the village is 930.

Education
The village has the following schools/educational institutions.
 Haladiapadar U.P.S School

References

Villages in Ganjam district